Donnie Calvin is an American reggae musician and singer. He was involved in Arthur Baker's studio project Rockers Revenge, which on September 18, 1982 had a number one hit on the Billboard Hot Dance Club Play chart with their version of Eddy Grant's "Walking on Sunshine" with Calvin as featured artist. The song also reached number 4 on the UK Singles Chart.

References

American reggae musicians
Year of birth missing (living people)
Living people